These are the official results of the Women's High Jump event at the 1984 Summer Olympics in Los Angeles, California. The final was held on Friday August 10, 1984.

Medalists

Abbreviations
All results shown are in metres

Records

Results

Qualification
Held on Thursday August 9, 1984

Final
Held on August 10, 1984

See also
1982 Women's European Championships High Jump (Athens)
1983 Women's World Championships High Jump (Helsinki)
1984 Women's Friendship Games High Jump (Prague)
1986 Women's European Championships High Jump (Stuttgart)
1987 Women's World Championships High Jump (Rome)

References

H
High jump at the Olympics
1984 in women's athletics
Women's events at the 1984 Summer Olympics